Lenie may refer to:
Places
Lenie, Albania, a municipality in Albania
Lenie, Scotland, a hamlet in Scotland
Lenie Passage in Antarctica
Lenie Wielkie a village in Poland

First name
Lenie Dijkstra (born 1967), Dutch racing cyclist
Lenie Gerrietsen (born 1930), Dutch Olympic gymnast
Lenie 't Hart (born 1941), Dutch animal rights activist
Lenie Lanting-Keller (1925–1995), Dutch diver
Lenie de Nijs (born 1939), Dutch swimmer
Lenie Onzia (born 1989), Belgian football player